Terry Slater (December 5, 1937 – December 5, 1991) was a Canadian ice hockey player and coach. In the World Hockey Association, he coached the teams Los Angeles Sharks and Cincinnati Stingers.

Career 
Born in Kirkland Lake, Ontario, Slater began his career in 1958 at St. Lawrence University, where he was a two time All American, and played hockey in the National Collegiate Athletic Association. In his first season, he scored 50 points in 22 games. After two more seasons at St. Lawrence University, Slater was in 1961 in the former professional hockey league Western Hockey League and signed a contract with the Los Angeles Blades. In his only season he scored 17 goals, 24 assists and scored 41 points in 52 games. In 1963 he continued his career with the Seattle Totems. That same year he left the team and went to the Toledo Blades in the International Hockey League. After two years, 125 games and 106 points scorer for the Toledo Blades, he finished his playing career at an early stage.

His coaching career began with the University of Toledo in 1965 where he coached the Rockets inaugural season and went 19-1. For the 1967/68 season returned to the Toledo Blades and received a contract as coach of the team. Two years later he accepted a job at the Des Moines Oak Leafs, where he worked again as a head coach, reaching the team twice in a row to qualify for the playoffs. In season 1972/73 he was appointed to the newly formed World Hockey Association and became a coach with the Los Angeles Sharks. In his first season with the team he made the move into the playoffs and failed in the first round against the Houston Aeros. The following season he was sacked after 19 games since the team played with five wins and 14 defeats of expectations. For the 1975/76 season Slater took a job with the Cincinnati Stingers, where he worked as a coach. In the first season, the playoffs have been missed in the following season divided the team in the first round by the Indianapolis Racers.

During the 1977-78 season he took a job with the Kalamazoo Wings in the International Hockey League, where he replaced Bob Lemieux during the season as a coach. He then coached the hockey team of Colgate University in the ECAC to 1991. In 1990 he coached the Red Raiders to a school record 31-6-1, winning the championship of the ECAC. As a result, the team took part in the championship of the NCAA and lost to Wisconsin.

Twenty months after the run to the finals Slater suffered a severe stroke while at home. He was transported to Crouse Irving Memorial Hospital where he died 4 days later just after his 54th birthday.

In 2013, the documentary "The General" was made, which chronicles Terry Slater and the improbable story of the 1989-1990 Colgate University Men's Ice Hockey Team run to the ECAC Championship and Division I NCAA Finals.  Featured in the documentary were players Karl Clauss, Joel Gardner, Steve Spott, Grant Slater, as well as assistant coach Brian Durocher and Student Assistant Eric Opin, retired SID Bob Cornell, and numerous Village of Hamilton, New York residents.

Career Statistics

Head coaching record

WHA

Other leagues

College

† Slater died during the season

Awards and honours

References

External links

1937 births
1991 deaths
AHCA Division I men's ice hockey All-Americans
Canadian ice hockey coaches
Canadian ice hockey players
Cincinnati Stingers
Colgate Raiders men's ice hockey coaches
Ice hockey people from Ontario
Seattle Totems (WHL) players
Sportspeople from Kirkland Lake
St. Lawrence Saints men's ice hockey players
World Hockey Association coaches